Rubropsichia kartaboana is a species of moth of the family Tortricidae. It is found in Guyana.

References

Moths described in 2011
Rubropsichia
Moths of South America
Taxa named by Józef Razowski